The borders of Akrotiri and Dhekelia refer to the international boundary between the Sovereign Base Areas  of Akrotiri and Dhekelia (a British overseas territory) and the republic of Cyprus.

The SBAs consist of two enclaves in the island of Cyprus. Dhekelia is also bound by the UN Buffer Zone and the unrecognised state in Northern Cyprus.

History

Customs and identity checks

Possession of a passport, or an EU compliant national identity card is generally needed in Cyprus.

There is no "hard" land border with Cyprus, and entry to the public areas of both SBAs can be done without any difficulty.  In the exchange of notes establishing them the British government specifically stated that it would not, "...create  customs  posts  or  other  frontier  barriers  between  the  Sovereign Base Areas and the Republic."   More formal controls do exist at the Republic of Northern Cyprus boundary.

A passport is required to travel between Cyprus/SBAs and Northern Cyprus. Issues concerning the validity of car insurance and customs are specified by SBAs' administration.

References